Belleview station is an light rail station in Denver, Colorado, United States. It is served by the E and R Lines, operated by the Regional Transportation District (RTD), and was opened on November 17, 2006. This is the primary station serving the Denver Technological Center. The station features a public art installation of a geometric pattern of roadway reflectors entitled Thunder over the Rockies through its pedestrian tunnel. It was created by Richard Elliott and dedicated in 2006.

References

RTD light rail stations in Denver
Railway stations in the United States opened in 2006
2006 establishments in Colorado